Urivi is a village in Pedana mandal, Krishna District, Andhra Pradesh, India.

Demographics 
Telugu is the local language. Total population of Urivi is 1,937. Males are 984 and Females are 953; living in 485 Houses. Total area of Urivi is 1,015 hectares.

Villages in Krishna district